Camerawork (1976–1985) was a British bi-monthly photography magazine promoting humanist, socialist and activist photography.

History
Half Moon Photography Workshop, a collective of photographers, initiated community photography education, Half Moon Gallery and publishing activities in the East End in the early 1970s, and out of this grew the magazine Camerawork, from which the collective then took its name, established in 1976 by Jo Spence with the socialist historian of photography Terry Dennett.

They were joined on the cooperative editorial team for the first edition (February 1976), themed 'The Politics of Photography', by Tony Bock, Roger Eaton, Mike Goldwater, Janet Goldberg, Marilyn Noad, Tom Picton, George Solomonides, and Paul Trevor, with writings by Terry Dennett, Tom Picton, Jo Spence, and Paul Trevor and pictures by Nick Hedges, Ron McCormick, Larry Herman, Chris Searle, Exit, Helmut Newton, and Claire Schwob. Subsequent editions were also themed, with often controversial topics.

The group moved to a new gallery also named Camerawork, on Roman Road in 1977 – a space now used by arts charity Four Corners.

Origins
Coming out of the 1960s protests and Marxism, documentary photography in the 1970s, Camerawork's humanist, leftist stance and preference for politically 'committed' or 'activist' photography was established from the first issue, in which the editorial read;

The magazine promoted several photographer collectives; the Hackney Flashers, Union Place and the Exit Group of Chris Steele-Perkins, Nicholas Battye and Paul Trevor.

The magazine folded in 1985, with no. 32, summer 1985.

Legacy
The Camerawork archives are held by Four Corners, the Photography and the Archive Research Centre (PARC) at the University of the Arts London (UAL) and The Bishopsgate Institute.

Four Corners Digital Archive makes all copies of Camerawork available to view online as well as resources covering Four Corners and Half Moon Photography Workshop (later Camerawork) for the period 1972 to 1987: oral histories,  film and audio archive, and more than 3000 examples selected from exhibitions, posters, press releases and ephemera.

References

1976 establishments in the United Kingdom
1985 disestablishments in the United Kingdom
Visual arts magazines published in the United Kingdom
Bi-monthly magazines published in the United Kingdom
Defunct magazines published in the United Kingdom
Humanism
Left-wing politics in the United Kingdom
Magazines established in 1976
Magazines disestablished in 1985
Photography magazines
Photography in the United Kingdom
Magazines published in London